"Hand in My Pocket" is a song by Canadian recording artist and songwriter Alanis Morissette from her third studio album, Jagged Little Pill (1995). The song was written by Morissette and Glen Ballard and was released as the second single from the album on October 16, 1995, five months after the album release. The song received generally favorable reviews from music critics, who applauded Morissette's songwriting.

"Hand in My Pocket" also received substantial success through radio airplay in the US. The song became Morissette's second number-one hit on the US Billboard Modern Rock Tracks chart. The song also reached the top 10 in New Zealand and Canada, where it was her first number-one single. An accompanying music video was released for the single, featuring Morissette at a festival, driving her car in black and white form, which also received positive reviews.

Background
In 1991, MCA Records Canada released Morissette's debut studio album Alanis, which went Platinum in Canada. This was followed by her second album, Now Is the Time, but it was a commercial failure, selling only a little more than half the copies of her first album. With her two-album deal with MCA Records Canada complete, Morissette was left without a major label contract. In 1993, Morissette's publisher Leeds Levy at MCA Music Publishing introduced her to manager Scott Welch. Welch told HitQuarters he was impressed by her "spectacular voice", her character and her lyrics. At the time she was still living with her parents. Together they decided it would be best for her career to move to Toronto and start writing with other people.

After graduating from high school, Morissette moved from Ottawa to Toronto. Her publisher funded part of her development and when she met producer and songwriter Glen Ballard, he believed in her talent enough to let her use his studio. The two wrote and recorded Morissette's first internationally released album, Jagged Little Pill, and by early 1995, she had signed a deal with Maverick Records. According to Welch, every label they had approached had passed on Morissette apart from Maverick.

Writing and composition
"Hand in My Pocket" was written by Morissette and Glen Ballard. Ballard met Morissette on March 8, 1994, after his publishing company matched them up. According to Ballard, the connection was "instant", and within 30 minutes of meeting each other they had begun experimenting with different sounds in Ballard's home studio in San Fernando Valley, California. Ballard also declared to Rolling Stone that, "I just connected with her as a person, and, almost parenthetically, it was like 'Wow, you're 19?' She was so intelligent and ready to take a chance on doing something that might have no commercial application. Although there was some question about what she wanted to do musically, she knew what she didn't want to do, which was anything that wasn't authentic and from her heart."

The song is a mainstream rock song. The chorus of "Hand in My Pocket" uses a poetry technique, "rhyme juxtaposition", as its primary lyrical structure, as exemplified by the off-set coupling of the first and second stanzas of each chorus.  In the first chorus for example, "fine, fine, fine" is coupled with "a high five", when it should, according to traditional rhyming schemes, be instead set against the "a peace sign" which closes the third chorus, and which is in turn, coupled with a first line ending with the phrase, "a cigarette", which is a clear rhyme with the end of the second chorus: "out just yet".  Morissette does not carry the scheme consistently throughout the song (there are, for instance, no rhymes for "hailing a taxicab" or "playing the piano").

"Hand in My Pocket" is written in the key of G major and moves in common time at a tempo of 92 beats per minute. Morissette's vocals span from G3 to C5 in the song.

Critical reception
While reviewing Jagged Little Pill, AllMusic dubbed "Hand in My Pocket" an album highlight. Steve Baltin from Cash Box described it as "enticing", noting that it includes "a well-placed harmonica solo from Morissette herself." British magazine Music Week rated the song four out of five, adding, "The second single from the abrasive and rampantly successful Alanis sees her Marianne Faithfull-circa-Wydja Do It attitude coupled with pop metal guitar and loping bass for maximum effect."

Chart performance
"Hand in My Pocket" peaked at number one in her native Canada, becoming Morissette's first number one single there. The song also peaked at number one on the US Modern Rock Tracks (Alternative) chart, at number four on the US Mainstream Top 40 (Pop Songs) chart, at number 15 on the Hot 100 Airplay chart and at number eight on the Mainstream Rock Tracks chart. The song was  successful throughout North America although the single was not released as a CD Single. Therefore, it did not reach the Hot 100.

Elsewhere, the song debuted at number 49 in Australia, and peaked at number 13, staying there for two consecutive weeks. The song debuted at number 39 in New Zealand and peaked at number seven, the only country outside of North America where it reached the top ten. The song had moderate success in Europe, debuting at number 56 in Sweden, and only managing to peak at number 45 on the chart. It also peaked at number 39 in France, staying on the chart for five weeks, and number 86 in the Netherlands with five weeks on that chart.

"Hand in My Pocket" received moderate to major success worldwide. In New Zealand the song peaked at number seven and was certified gold by Recorded Music NZ (RMNZ), for shipments of 15,000 copies. The song saw some success in the United Kingdom, debuting and peaking at number 26 on the week ending of October 28, 1995, over the course of the next two weeks "Hand in My Pocket", fell to number 37 then number 54, spending a total of three weeks on the chart.

Promotion
The single was added in the set list for Morissette's concert tour, Jagged Little Pill World Tour (1995). The song was added to the tour's video album Jagged Little Pill Live (1997). Since then, the song has been included in her albums MTV Unplugged (1999), Feast on Scraps (2002), and The Collection, as well as 1997 Grammys and the MTV Unplugged compilation albums.

Music video
Directed by Mark Kohr and filmed in black-and-white and slow motion, the song's video features Morissette among a homecoming parade. It was filmed in the Windsor Terrace neighborhood of Brooklyn, New York. As well as censoring the song's profanity, the video features extra guitar 'licks' on the lead-up to the bridge.

In popular culture
"Hand in My Pocket" served as the theme song in the unaired pilot episode of the television show Dawson's Creek, but Morissette decided not to have it used as the theme after the show was picked up. In 2015, the song was covered in an episode of season six of the American television series Glee, called "Jagged Little Tapestry", by actresses Naya Rivera and Heather Morris as part of a mashup with Carole King's "I Feel the Earth Move"—Rivera's character Santana sings the song as a prelude to her proposal to Morris's character Brittany. "Hand in My Pocket" featured prominently in the final scene of the third season of Amazon's Transparent, when the character Shelly Pfefferman performs a cabaret version of the song aboard a cruise ship while her family looks on. In 2017, the song was used in the American film Lady Bird.

Track listings

 UK CD1 and Australian CD single
 "Hand in My Pocket" – 3:37
 "Head over Feet" (live acoustic) – 4:07
 "Not the Doctor" (live acoustic) – 3:57

 UK CD2
 "Hand in My Pocket" – 3:37
 "Right Through You" (live acoustic) – 3:03
 "Forgiven" (live acoustic) – 4:23

 UK cassette single
 "Hand in My Pocket" – 3:37
 "Head over Feet" (live acoustic) – 4:07

 Japanese CD single
 "Hand in My Pocket" (album version)
 "Not the Doctor" (live in Japan)

Charts

Weekly charts

Year-end charts

Certifications

Release history

Covers and parodies
 It was parodied by 'Rockin Jock' but credit for this parody, 'Trouble', is usually wrongly accredited to Billy Connolly under the title 'Evil Scotsman'.
 The song has also been parodied by Amateur Transplants on the album Fitness to Practice as part of the song "Snippets".
 It was parodied by Bob Rivers under the title "Hand in a Lightsocket".
 The song was covered by Canadian pop-punk band Seaway, released as a single on July 15, 2016.
 Judith Light performed the song in the third-season finale of Transparent as part of her character's one-woman show. Light's performance was universally praised.
 Atom Smash covered the song on their 2013 album "Passage to the Sun".
 Glee covered this song in a mashup with Carole King's "I Feel The Earth Move". It was sung by Naya Rivera (Santana Lopez) and Heather Morris (Brittany Pierce).
 MacKenzie Porter, a Canadian country musician, did a cover of this song as a single under her Loft Sessions on January 24, 2020.

References

External links
 [ "Alanis Morissette – Artist Chart History"]. Billboard. Retrieved August 23, 2006.
 [ "Alanis Morissette – Billboard Singles"]. Allmusic. Retrieved August 23, 2006.

1995 singles
1995 songs
Alanis Morissette songs
Black-and-white music videos
Maverick Records singles
Reprise Records singles
RPM Top Singles number-one singles
Song recordings produced by Glen Ballard
Songs written by Alanis Morissette
Songs written by Glen Ballard
Warner Music Group singles